Pandan Reservoir MRT station is a future elevated Mass Rapid Transit (MRT) station on the Jurong Region line in Jurong East, Singapore.

It will be the southern terminus of the East Branch of the Jurong Region line. Trains entering service at this station will terminate at Tengah.

History
On 9 May 2018, LTA announced that Pandan Reservoir station would be part of the proposed Jurong Region line (JRL). The station will be constructed as part of Phase 2, JRL (East), consisting of 7 stations between Tengah and Pandan Reservoir, and is expected to be completed in 2028.

Contract J109 for the design and construction of Pandan Reservoir station and associated viaducts was awarded to Daewoo Engineering & Construction Co. Pte Ltd - Yongnam Engineering and Construction Pte Ltd Joint Venture at a sum of S$320.4 million in July 2020. Construction is expected to start in 2020. Contract J109 also includes the design and construction of the Jurong Town Hall and Toh Guan stations and the  associated viaducts.

Initially expected to open in 2027, the restrictions on the construction due to the COVID-19 pandemic has led to delays in the JRL line completion, and the date was pushed to 2028.

Location
The station complex will be situated next to Jurong Town Hall Road, between the junction with Pandan Gardens, and the junction with Teban Gardens Road. It is located in the Jurong East planning area in the Teban Gardens subzone, next to Commonwealth Secondary School.

Access to the station will be via 5 exits on each side of Jurong Town Hall Road.

References

Mass Rapid Transit (Singapore) stations
Proposed railway stations in Singapore
Railway stations scheduled to open in 2028